Vengeance Descending is Crystal Eyes' third album released in 2003 by Heavy Fidelity.

Track listing
"Vengeance Descending" - 5:52 
"Highland Revenge" - 5:02
"Child of Rock" - 6:17
"Mr. Failure" - 5:32
"Dream Chaser" - 6:43
"The Wizard's Apprentice" - 7:11
"Metal Crusade" - 5:12
"The Beast in Velvet" - 5:29
"Heart of the Mountain" - 5:43
"Oblivion in the Visionary World" - 5:54

Credits
Mikael Dahl - Vocals and Guitar
Jonathan Nyberg - Guitar
Claes Wikander - Bass Guitar
Stefan Svantesson - Drums
Daniel Heiman - Vocals on "The Wizard's Apprentice"

Production and mixing by Mikael Dahl and Claes Wikander at Crystal Sounds
Mastering by Tobias Lindell
Cover artwork by Kristian Wåhlin

2003 albums
Crystal Eyes albums